The Spirit of the Eagle Award is a Boy Scouts of America (BSA) honorary posthumous special recognition for a youth member under the age of 21 who has lost his or her life in an accident or through illness.

The intention of this award is to help heal and comfort the youth member's family, loved ones, and friends with their loss. It recognizes the joy, happiness, and life-fulfilling experiences the Scouting program made in the youth's life and serves as a final salute and tribute to the departed.

The award is limited to registered youth members and must be submitted by the unit committee within six months of the youth's death. The award consists of a certificate with a soaring eagle, and is imprinted with Spirit of the Eagle Award and Espiritu Del Aguila.

References

Advancement and recognition in the Boy Scouts of America
1998 establishments in the United States
Awards established in 1998
Posthumous recognitions